Dimbulah is a town and locality in Far North Queensland, Australia,  from Cairns by road, on the Atherton Tableland. It is within the local government area of Shire of Mareeba (between 2008 and 2013, it was within the Tablelands Region).

Geography 

Dimbulah is approximately 100 km south-west of Cairns.  The town was established near the Walsh River as a watering point for trains servicing the Hodgkinson goldfields to the north-west along with the former mining town of Wolfram which is also located to the north-west of the locality. There are historical ruins of early mining there as well as a present-day open cut mine.

The Tablelands railway line passes through the locality which is served by the following railway stations (from north to south):

 Chircan railway station, now abandoned
 Dimbulah railway station
 Leafgold railway station, now abandoned
 Carbonate Creek railway station, now abandoned
 Solanum railway station, now abandoned
 Boonmoo railway station
 Verdure railway station, now abandoned

Due to the availability of water, Dimbulah also established itself as an agricultural area. However, the Walsh River alone was not reliable enough as a source of water for irrigation.  The establishment of Tinaroo Dam and the Mareeba-Dimbulah irrigation scheme provided water security which led to the establishment of many large-scale agricultural enterprises, starting with the expansion of the tobacco industry.

The soils types in the Dimbulah area are particularly suited to tobacco farming due to being based on granitic sand.  The 'lighter' soils facilitated the cultivation of a lighter style of tobacco leaf which was in high demand.  Some of the soil types in the area include: Murphy, Algoma, Price and Cobra.  These soils are mostly colluvial soils derived from weathered metamorphic rock as well as older alluvium derived from granitic rock.

The main vegetation is low open woodlands consisting mainly of the eucalypts such as bloodwood, box along with melaleucas and a grass cover of kangaroo grass and spear grass.

Climate
Local residents enjoy a tropical climate with hot, wet summers and dry, mild winters.

History
The town was established in 1876 to service the Tyrconnell Gold Mine, one of the richest mines on the Hodgkinson Gold Fields. The name "Dimbulah" is thought to have come from the local Indigenous Australian word for "long waterhole", referring to the Walsh River that runs nearby the town. Dimboola Post Office opened by 1900 and was renamed Dimbulah in 1904.

The area around Dimbulah was originally home to the Djankun and Kuku Djungan tribe. During the 1920s the Queensland Government forcibly removed most of their children, forcing the tribe to scatter.

In the early 1900s the area received an influx of Italian migrants and in 1928 tobacco was introduced, becoming the area's major industry soon after. At its peak, there were 800 growers in the area, producing over 8,000 tonnes (60% of national yield) of tobacco a year. "The Way Back In" is an Australian heritage project that documents a small selection of Australian heritage within the Italian communities in Dimbulah, Innisfail and Cairns.

Dimbulah Provisional School opened on 28 September 1914. On 1 December 1914, it became Dimbulah State School. On 25 January 1965 , it was expanded to include a secondary department. The school celebrated its centenary on 27 September 2014.

The Dimbulah parish of the Roman Catholic Diocese of Cairns was established in 1963.

St Anthony's Catholic School opened in January 1966 by the Sisters of St Joseph with an initial enrolment of 64 students. The Sisters operated the school for 22 years, after which it was operated by the Roman Catholic Diocese of Cairns.

The Dimbulah Public Library opened in 1995 with a minor refurbishment in 2013.

Heritage listings 
Dimbulah has a number of sites listed on the Queensland Heritage Register including:
 Main Street, Wolfram: La Société Française des Métaux Rares treatment plant
 Wolfram Road, Wolfram: Thermo Electric Ore Reduction Corporation Mill

Economy
Tobacco remained the dominant crop until recent years when government policy compelled its demise. Recent attempts at alternative crops such as tea trees, mangoes, sugar cane, coffee, lemons, limes, avocados, papaws, papayas, peanuts, soya beans, lychees, grapes and cash crops (pumpkins, melons, etc.) have met with mixed success. Farming is a significant employment option in Dimbulah and many travelers, including backpackers, are employed as short-term farm labourers, particularly during the busy mango harvest from November to January.

Education 
Dimbulah State School is a government primary and secondary (Prep-10) school for boys and girls at 48-50 Kennedy Street. In 2018, the school had an enrolment of 150 students with 17 teachers (14 full-time equivalent) and 13 non-teaching staff (9 full-time equivalent).

St Anthony's School is a Catholic primary (Prep-6) school for boys and girls at 3 Hyde Street. In 2018, the school had an enrolment of 37 students with 8 teachers (5 full-time equivalent) and 10 non-teaching staff (4 full-time equivalent).

There are no schools offering education to Year 12 in Dimbulah. The nearest government secondary school with education to Year 12 is Mareeba State High School in Mareeba to the north-east. However, it would be too distant from some parts of Dimbulah and distance education and boarding schools would be other options.

Also available are:
 Dimbulah Limited Hours Child Care, Age range 15 months – 5 years
 Dimbulah Kindergarten, Age range 3–5 years (C&K Affiliated)

Amenities 

The Mareeba Shire operates a public library at Shire Hall at the corner of Raleigh Street and Burke Development Road.

The Dimbulah branch of the Queensland Country Women's Association meets at the QCWA Hall at 22 Brickley Street.

St Anthony's Catholic Church is in Raleigh Street. It is within the Dimbulah Parish of the Roman Catholic Diocese of Cairns which is administered from the Atherton parish.

Accommodation is available at the town's caravan park or the Junction Hotel.

As at 2021, the town's retail facilities include a Bendigo Community Bank with 24-hour ATM, Australia Post office, Dimbulah Chemist, Dimbulah Health & Beauty, Camp 64 Museum Cafe, Junction Hotel, bakery, butcher, TGT hardware store, mini mart, One Stop convenience store and two petrol stations. 

Community groups include the Dimbulah Community Centre,  Men's Shed, Lions Club, Chamber of Commerce, museum association, and several other faith-based groups.

There are many sporting clubs including swimming (with an Olympic-sized pool), tennis, horse & pony, lawn bowls, Rhee Taekwon-Do, and soccer/football.

Services include Police station, Queensland Health clinic, fixed wireless NBN, and 4G mobile service (Telstra and Optus). Nearby properties access NBN via SkyMuster satellite or mobile broadband.

Events

Important local events include the annual Lion's Festival and the Great Wheelbarrow Race both held annually in May.

St Anthony's Catholic Church celebrates the Feast Day of St Anthony of Padua on the 3rd Sunday of June with a special mass, followed by a procession, barbeque and pesca (a lucky dip which takes its name from the Italian pesca miracolosa, the miraculous catch of fish).

Transport 
Public transport from Cairns is possible, although infrequent, on Trans North's bus service which stops at Mareeba,  from Dimbulah. The Savannahlander tourist train stops in Dimbulah as well but does not operate year-round.

Notable people 
 The Hon. Keith De Lacy AM, former Treasurer of Queensland
Chris Sheppard, former NRL player
William Yang, photographer and actor

References

External links 

 University of Queensland: Queensland Places: Dimbulah
 Town map of Dimbulah, 1984

 
Towns in Queensland
Populated places established in 1876
Shire of Mareeba
1876 establishments in Australia
Populated places in Far North Queensland
Localities in Queensland